The 20th National Congress of the Chinese Communist Party (CCP), commonly referred to as Èrshí Dà, opened in Beijing on 16 October 2022 and closed on 22 October 2022. The CCP Congress endorsed the membership list of the Central Commission for Discipline Inspection and elected the 20th Central Committee of the CCP. The day after the closing of the Congress, the 1st Plenary Session was held at which the Central Committee approved the membership of the CCP's Politburo and its Standing Committee, the party's most powerful decision-making body.

The CCP General Secretary Xi Jinping secured an unprecedented third term as China's top leader at the Congress. It will be followed by the 21st National Congress of the CCP in 2027.

Background and preparation
Preparations for the 20th Chinese Communist Party National Congress began in 2021 and ended with a plenary session of the 19th Central Committee, a few days prior to the 20th National Congress. Elections for the delegates of the 20th Chinese Communist Party National Congress started in November 2021, as well as receiving and amending party documents. A total of 2,296 delegates were elected to represent the Chinese Communist Party (CCP)'s 96.7 million members by 25 September 2022.

In May 2022, the CCP General Office issued a set of regulations warning retired members not to make any ‘negative’ political comments or discussion of the party's policies in the run-up to the 20th National Congress and that violations of the disciplinary rules will be ‘dealt with seriously’.

In September 2022, unsubstantiated rumours of a coup spread throughout social media, but were quashed after Xi Jinping appeared days later.

On 15 October 2022, a preparatory meeting of the party congress was presided by CCP general secretary Xi Jinping, which elected the Presidium of the 20th Chinese Communist Party National Congress and the Qualification Review Committee. In the meeting, it was decided that Wang Huning will serve as the secretary-general of the party congress. On the same day, the presidium of the National Congress, chaired by Wang Huning, held its first session.

Protest 

On 13 October 2022, three days prior to the opening of the CCP National Congress, the Beijing Sitong Bridge protest took place. This protest against Xi Jinping and his policies was rare as it came just days before the start of the Congress, a period during which the authorities imposed extremely tight control over protests and dissent.

Similar protest slogans subsequently appeared in other cities in China and around the world. Some people shared these messages as graffiti or via AirDrop.

Opening speech 
On the opening day of the congress, Xi gave a speech for around 104 minutes, roughly half of his speech in the 19th Congress. During the speech, he defended China's zero-COVID approach to the COVID-19 pandemic in mainland China, said that Hong Kong had "a major transition from chaos to governance", advocated for Taiwan's "peaceful reunification" but vowed to not renounce the use of force, advocated for "common prosperity," and denounced corruption. On China's position on the world stage, he said that "China’s international influence, appeal and power to shape the world has significantly increased". Overall, the speech was said to be showing continuity rather than change.

Revisions to the party constitution 
The Congress saw several amendments to the CCP Constitution, adding the Two Establishes and Two Safeguards, which call for establishing the status of  Xi Jinping as the core of the CCP and establishing the guiding role of Xi Jinping Thought. The amendments included adding opposition to Taiwan independence.

Leadership changes

Politburo Standing Committee 
The CCP General Secretary Xi Jinping secured an unprecedented third term as China's leader. The newly elected members of the 20th Politburo Standing Committee in addition to Xi were, in their orders of precedence:

 Li Qiang (born 1959) – seen as a close ally of Xi, Li has been the Communist Party secretary of Shanghai since 2017 and is expected to succeed Li Keqiang as Chinese premier in 2023. Seen as business-friendly, he nonetheless gained criticism for his handling of the two-month lockdown of Shanghai due to a coronavirus outbreak.
 Zhao Leji (born 1957) – previously the 6th-ranking member of the PSC and secretary of the CCDI, Zhao is expected to succeed Li Zhanshu as the chairman of the Standing Committee of the National People's Congress.
 Wang Huning (born 1955) – previously the 5th-ranking member of the PSC and first Secretary of the CCP Secretariat, Wang is expected to succeed Wang Yang as the chairman of the Chinese People's Political Consultative Conference. Seen as a close advisor of Xi, he is considered to be behind the ideological concepts of Xi and previous Party general secretaries Jiang Zemin and Hu Jintao.
 Cai Qi (born 1955) – serving as the Communist Party secretary of Beijing since 2017, Cai became the first secretary of the CCP Secretariat. He is considered to be a close ally of Xi.
 Ding Xuexiang (born 1962) – serving as the director of the CCP General Office, Ding was effectively Xi's chief of staff since 2017. He is a close ally of Xi and is expected to succeed Han Zheng as the first vice premier.
 Li Xi (born 1956) – serving as the Communist Party secretary of Guangdong since 2017, Li became the secretary of the CCDI, succeeding Zhao Leji. He is considered to have connections to Xi.

Removal of Hu Jintao 

At the closing ceremony on 22 October 2022, Hu Jintao, the former General Secretary of the CCP and President of China preceding Xi, who had been sitting next to Xi, was "inexplicably" pulled from his seat and escorted out of the hall by two men in suits and with name badges. According to Agence France-Presse journalists, Hu "initially seemed reluctant to leave." Xi Jinping appeared wholly unconcerned but Li Zhanshu and Wang Huning, both sitting to Hu's left, appeared visibly concerned. Li Zhanshu attempted to help him until being pulled back by Wang Huning. Hu nudged and whispered to Xi, and gave a pat on the back of Premier Li Keqiang before being led away. No Politburo members at the front row showed any visible reaction towards Hu's removal. 

This incident occurred before the congressional voting on the report of the 19th Central Committee, the work report of the 19th Central Commission for Discipline Inspection, and an amendment to the Party Constitution. Hu was absent from the voting due to this incident. Subsequent official voting results showed that all proposals passed unanimously with no abstentions or negative votes. The 20th Central Committee was also elected on the same day; Xi Jinping and Wang Huning were among the members of the new Central Committee while Li Keqiang, Li Zhanshu and Wang Yang were not.

Xinhua News Agency, China's official press agency, stated on Twitter that "When [Hu] was not feeling well during the session, his staff, for his health, accompanied him to a room next to the meeting venue for a rest. Now, he is much better."

Subsequent footage released on 25 October by Channel News Asia captures an apparent argument about official papers between Hu and Li Zhanshu before Xi requested for his removal. The incident was not broadcast in China and both Hu's and Hu's son's names were blocked by Chinese censors.

Commentary 
James Palmer, a deputy editor at Foreign Policy, interpreted the incident to have been political, suggesting that it could have been Xi's intention to "deliberately and publicly humiliate his predecessor." Xi had been harshly critical in his previous speeches, where he spoke of "the problem that the party's leadership had been weakened, blurred, diluted, and marginalized" before his leadership. The Economist said that while it is possible the act was deliberate, it was more likely that Hu was not feeling well, saying that the event "looked consistent with a sudden episode of mental confusion". Jude Blanchette, an expert at the Center for Strategic and International Studies, said that the event "didn’t have the stage-managed feel of an orchestrated purge", while Bill Bishop, a China expert, noted that the China Central Television would likely not show Hu during the news footage of the event if he was purged.

Reaction

Countries

North Korea 
Workers' Party of Korea general secretary Kim Jong Un sent a congratulatory letter to Xi Jinping on his reelection as CCP general secretary, saying he hoped to further develop their ties.

Russia 
Russian President Vladimir Putin congratulated Chinese leader Xi Jinping on Sunday on securing an unprecedented third term as leader.

Taiwan 
Shortly after Xi Jinping's opening speech in which he stated that the People's Republic of China would never renounce the option of conducting military operations against Taiwan, the Office of the President of Taiwan issued a statement in which it said it would not compromise on either its sovereignty or democracy. The Kuomintang, on the other hand, congratulated Xi Jinping on his reelection as CCP general secretary.

Stock markets
Stocks related to Chinese corporations suffered major losses on October 24, with the Hang Seng Index falling 6%, its worst daily decline since the 2008 financial crisis. The Shanghai Stock Exchange only declined by 2% after the meeting. The renminbi also nearly fell to a rate of 7.31 to the dollar. The Golden Dragon China Index, an index of multiple Chinese companies listed on American exchanges, fell 14% in its worst daily drop since 2004, before partially rebounding a day later.

See also

 Xi Jinping Administration
 Succession of power in China

References

External links
 Full Transcript in English of President & CCP General Secretary Xi Jinping's report to China's 2022 party congress

National Congress of the Chinese Communist Party
20th National Congress of the Chinese Communist Party
2022 elections in China
2022 conferences
October 2022 events in China
Xi Jinping